Chepino Saddle (‘Chepinska Sedlovina’ \'che-pin-ska se-dlo-vi-'na\) is the saddle of elevation 2526 m in north-central Sentinel Range in Ellsworth Mountains, Antarctica, linking Probuda Ridge to the southwest to Bangey Heights to the northeast.  It is part of the glacial divide between Embree Glacier to the north and Ellen Glacier to the south.

The saddle is named after the settlement of Chepino in Western Bulgaria and the homonymous Chepino Valley in Southern Bulgaria.

Location
US mapping in 1961, updated in 1988.

Maps
 Vinson Massif.  Scale 1:250 000 topographic map.  Reston, Virginia: US Geological Survey, 1988.
 Antarctic Digital Database (ADD). Scale 1:250000 topographic map of Antarctica. Scientific Committee on Antarctic Research (SCAR). Since 1993, regularly updated.

Notes

References
 Chepino Saddle. SCAR Composite Antarctic Gazetteer.
 Bulgarian Antarctic Gazetteer. Antarctic Place-names Commission. (details in Bulgarian, basic data in English)

External links
 Chepino Saddle. Copernix satellite image

Mountain passes of Ellsworth Land
Bulgaria and the Antarctic